The European Coalition Free Belarus was a political coalition in Belarus which opposed the continued rule of President Alexander Lukashenko.

In legislative elections held between October 13–17, 2004, the ECFB was part of the Democratic Centrist Coalition which did not secure any seats.

The coalition was formed by the following parties and political youth organizations:
Belarusian Social Democratic Party (People's Assembly) (Bielaruskaja Sacyjal-Demakratyčnaja Partyja - Nardonaja Hramada)
Belarusian Liberal Party of Freedom and Progress (PFP) (Bielaruskaja Liberalnaja Partyja Svabody i Prahresu)

The European Coalition became part of the wider United Democratic Forces of Belarus which in October 2005 elected Alaksandar Milinkievič as their candidate for the 2006 Presidential Election.

References

Belarusian opposition
Defunct political party alliances in Belarus
Pro-European political parties in Belarus